Jap Herron: A Novel Written From The Ouija Board is a 1917 novel that author and self-proclaimed medium Emily Grant Hutchings claimed was written by Mark Twain, seven years after his death. Hutchings said that the novel was dictated to her and medium Lola Hays from beyond the grave by the deceased Twain through use of a Ouija board.

History 
The novel rose to fame when The New York Times ran a review of the book on September 9, 1917. The work was claimed to be authored by the spirit of late Mark Twain by two mediums, Emily Grant Hutchings and Lola V. Hays, with Hays being the passive recipient whose hands guided the Ouija board. Previously Hutchings tried to contact Patience Worth. The two mediums purported to have started transcribing the novel in 1915, and that it took Twain two years to complete. Due to the popularity of Ouija boards at the time, many Americans purchased the book and accepted Hutchings' claims at face value.

Copyright lawsuit 

In an attempt to stop Hutchings from profiting from  Mark Twain's name, Clara Clemens (Mark Twain's daughter) filed a lawsuit in the Supreme Court against Hutchings and her publisher Mitchell Kennerley on June 8, 1918. Because Clemens and her publishers were unable to prove that the book was not written by the ghost of Twain, a lawsuit was filed to have Hutchings either admit the book was a fraud or surrender all profits to the Mark Twain estate and Harper & Brothers, who at the time had sole rights to the publication of Mark Twain stories. While Hutchings never retracted her claims, the lawsuit was eventually dropped when Hutchings agreed to destroy all existing copies and cease publication.

References

External links 
 Jap Herron: a novel written from the Ouija board Internet Archive
 Google Books copy

1917 American novels
Channelled texts